Joshua Ryan Hutcherson (born October 12, 1992) is an American actor and producer. Hutcherson began acting in the early 2000s and appeared in several commercials and minor film and television roles before landing his first major role in 2002 in the pilot episode of House Blend. His first film role was in Miracle Dogs (2003) on Animal Planet, followed by a motion-capture performance in The Polar Express (2004) and a voice-acting role in Howl's Moving Castle (2005).

Hutcherson's other early film appearances include Little Manhattan and Zathura: A Space Adventure (both 2005), RV (2006), Bridge to Terabithia (2007), Journey to the Center of the Earth (2008), and The Kids Are All Right (2010). In 2011, 18-year-old Hutcherson landed the leading role of Peeta Mellark in the box office record-setting film series The Hunger Games, released yearly in 2012–2015, for which he won three MTV Movie Awards and a People's Choice Award. In the same period, he also played a lead role in Journey 2: The Mysterious Island (2012) and voice role in the animated film Epic (2013).

Throughout his career, Hutcherson has expressed an interest in directing and producing. He has served as an executive producer for Detention (2011), The Forger (2012), and Escobar: Paradise Lost (2015), while also playing a lead role in each film. He is also heavily involved in the gay–straight alliance campaign "Straight But Not Narrow".

Early life
Born in Union, Kentucky on October 12, 1992, Hutcherson is the elder son of Michelle (née Fightmaster), a former Delta Air Lines employee who now assists with Josh's career, and Chris Hutcherson, an analyst for the United States Environmental Protection Agency (EPA). His parents, who were also born and raised in Kentucky, met in high school in Dry Ridge. He has one younger brother, Connor.

Hutcherson's interest in acting developed as a child despite his parents' concerns about the profession. According to the actor himself, he had "loved the entertainment industry" from the age of four. His father said that his son was compelled to perform for people from a very young age, possessing a personality that attracted people's attention. His mother said that he "bugged us so much" into becoming an actor, but believed it was a phase he was going through and would grow out of. At age eight, Hutcherson went through the yellow pages and contacted an acting agency. In January 2002, he and his mother met acting coach Bob Luke, who travelled from New York City to Kentucky to meet them. Luke advised them to go to Los Angeles and begin auditioning Hutcherson for TV pilots. At the time, his only acting experience had been in a Kroger television commercial and a Vacation Bible School training film. For three years, Hutcherson and his mother lived in Los Angeles' Oakwood apartments, a housing community that accommodates young child actors and their families.

Most of Hutcherson's childhood was spent on film sets rather than in a classroom. He attended New Haven Elementary School in Union until he began his career at the age of nine, after which he began homeschooling, with his mother as his teacher. He later returned to Kentucky to attend Ryle High School for one semester. Hutcherson played on the high school's soccer team and has been a keen sports enthusiast since, also displaying a passion for football and tennis. At the age of 13, he participated in a triathlon. He later said of his schooling experiences, "I know it's something kids have to deal with every single day but getting up at the same time every day and having to listen to teachers talk about things I could learn so much more easily on my own, I hated it."

Career

2002–2010: Early roles
After moving to Hollywood in 2002, Hutcherson appeared in various television commercials. He landed his first major acting role as Nicky Harper in the 2002 pilot episode of House Blend, followed by minor roles in an episode of ER and the pilot episode of Becoming Glen. The following year, he played the leading role of Charlie Logan in the television film Miracle Dogs, which aired on Animal Planet. Later that year, he starred opposite Peter Falk and Tim Daly in the television film, Wilder Days, playing Falk's grandson who accompanies him on a turbulent road trip. Daly was impressed with the young Hutcherson, remarking, "He's an exceptional kid. He's a really good actor, and he's very smart and confident in himself." Hutcherson's next role was as a boy dressed as Robin in his first feature film appearance, the well-reviewed independent film American Splendor, which won the grand jury prize at the Sundance Film Festival. His character in 2004's fantasy film The Polar Express, young Hero Boy, was created by motion-capture of his facial expressions and body movements. The film starred Tom Hanks in the lead role and received mixed reviews from critics. In the animated fantasy film Howl's Moving Castle, he voiced the character of Markl, working alongside two other lead characters Christian Bale and Billy Crystal. All of his dialogue for the film was recorded in about eight consecutive hours.

In 2005, Hutcherson appeared in several Hollywood films while trying to establish himself in the industry. He portrayed the minor role of Bucky Weston in the comedy Kicking & Screaming. In 2005's Little Manhattan, he had a lead role alongside his younger brother, Connor. Stella Papamichael of the BBC approved of his performance, saying that "Hutcherson's delivery is spot-on, showing a keen instinct for self-effacing humor that would make even Woody Allen feel that bit more inadequate", but Variety columnist Brian Lowry felt that Hutcherson "might have looked cute on the page, but even with his Linus voice the language and tone [didn't] feel natural." He next appeared in a lead role in Jon Favreau's Zathura: A Space Adventure, which he enjoyed filming owing to the number of special effects and stunts he was involved with. Hutcherson received the Young Artist Award for "Best Performance in a Feature Film by a Leading Young Actor" for the film.

Hutcherson's next appearance was in the comedy RV in early 2006, playing the son of Robin Williams' character, Bob Munro. He professed finding it difficult to concentrate during the production because he was "constantly laughing" at Williams' jokes and antics between takes. The film was not received favorably by critics; Variety said the film suffered from "blunt predictability and meager laughs". He received his second Young Artist Award nomination for his role, but lost to Logan Lerman in Hoot.

Hutcherson's breakthrough role in his career as a child actor came in 2007 when he portrayed Jesse Aarons in the fantasy drama Bridge to Terabithia. The film was shot on location in New Zealand for three and a half months. Hutcherson said of the filming: "That was an amazing experience. It doesn't get any prettier than that. There were beaches everywhere and all sorts of forests. We took little road trips everywhere and just had a lot of fun." He admitted to not having read the novel that the film is based upon before being cast. Author Ann C. Paietta describes his character of Jesse Aarons as "an introverted boy with four sisters, a financially strapped family, and a real talent for drawing" whose life is turned around when Leslie Burke (AnnaSophia Robb) arrives, with whom he creates an imaginary utopian world. Anne Hornaday of The Washington Post found his casting to be "a perfect fit" and commended how he portrayed the "sensitive, artistic, temperament" of his character, while Miriam Di Nunzio of the Chicago Sun-Times noted the chemistry between Hutcherson and Robb, referring to them as a "dynamic duo". He won his second Young Artist Award for "Best Performance in a Feature Film by a Leading Young Actor" for the film. Hutcherson's next role was in Firehouse Dog (2007), in which he played Shane Fahey, a firefighter's son who befriends a dog. He has expressed his pleasure in working and bonding with the four different dogs who played his canine co-star. The film received mixed reviews, although critics were favorable to Hutcherson. Following the film, Carrie Rickey of The Philadelphia Inquirer referred to him as the "Jodie Foster of Generation Y", remarking that with "each successive film Hutcherson dives deeper into his reservoir of shame and hurt and hope, unnerving for one so young, but also unusually urgent for an actor of any age."

In 2008, he appeared in the independent crime drama Winged Creatures (released as Fragments on DVD) alongside Dakota Fanning as they portrayed two teenage friends who survive a massacre, and in Journey to the Center of the Earth, a 3D film adaptation of the novel of the same name where he portrayed a teen who travels to Iceland with an uncle he hardly knows, played by Brendan Fraser. Over the next two years, he appeared as a boy named Steve "Leopard" Leonard who visits a freak show with his friends in the vampire fiction film adaptation of the book Cirque du Freak and had a supporting role in the critically acclaimed The Kids Are All Right, portraying the son of a lesbian couple, played by Annette Bening and Julianne Moore. According to Kaleem Aftab of The Independent, his role in the film was a pivotal point in his career and one of vital importance to continuing his career into adulthood. Hutcherson expressed gratitude at being cast in the film, displaying satisfaction with the intimacy and creative freedom that independent films provide over studio films. The film won the Golden Globe Award for Best Motion Picture – Musical or Comedy in 2010, and was a nominee for Best Picture at the 83rd Academy Awards. Gregory Ellwood of entertainment site HitFix stated: "Hutcherson's charismatic wit and natural instincts shine and it's arguably the first film where he proves he's more than just another sharp-looking teen actor."

2011–present: The Hunger Games and breakthrough

On April 4, 2011, Lionsgate announced that 18-year-old Hutcherson had been cast as Peeta Mellark in The Hunger Games series, opposite Jennifer Lawrence as Katniss Everdeen. He was eager to land the role, feeling that he related to the character extremely well. In preparation for filming, he had to bleach his hair and gain 15 pounds. Lawrence, a very close friend, has always spoken highly of him as an actor; in regards to his portrayal of Peeta Mellark she stated, "He's charming, he's sweet, he's down to earth, he's normal. He embodies all of it and brings it all to Peeta ... he's got all those great qualities and every single one of them comes across in every line he says out loud as Peeta." He became known for his pranks on set, leading to an accident as he was play-fighting with Lawrence who kicked him in the head, unintentionally knocking him unconscious and giving him a concussion. The initial film, The Hunger Games, was released on March 23, 2012, and went on to become one of the highest-grossing films of the year. Hutcherson received the MTV Movie Award for "Best Male Performance". He was also awarded the 2012 NewNowNext award for "Next Mega Star" and the National Association of Theatre Owners's 2012 CinemaCon award for "Breakthrough Performer of the Year". Peter Travers of Rolling Stone described the actor's portrayal saying, "[Hutcherson] brings humor and a bruised heart to a boy who needs to mature fast."

Between landing the role in The Hunger Games and the film's release, he played a lead role and served as an executive producer for two films: Detention (2011) and The Forger (2012). In Detention, he played the role of popular teenager Clapton Davis in a film the plot of which has been compared to 1985's The Breakfast Club. His role in The Forger was as a 15-year-old orphan who finds himself in trouble until Alfred Molina's character comes to his aid. The film was not well received but the actors' chemistry together and their performance was. He next reprised his role as Sean Anderson in the 2012 Journey to the Center of the Earth sequel, Journey 2: The Mysterious Island. Hutcherson has always been vocal about his desire to work on films of all sorts of genres. Regarding the switch from comedy drama The Kids Are All Right to the Journey sequel, he stated: "For me, I like to do all different types of films and to go from having that awesome [indie] kind of thing that I love doing so much with great characters and a really great script to a bigger kind of studio film, to just cover the whole kind of spectrum of movies is really, really cool." Although the film was largely panned, it fared well commercially and his performance was well received, with Kofi Outlaw of Screenrant.com appreciating how he "does a good job holding the screen and portraying a somewhat layered protagonist". Later in 2012, he appeared in Red Dawn, a remake of the 1984 film of the same name. The film was panned by critics, achieving only a 12 percent approval rating on Rotten Tomatoes, the lowest score of any film Hutcherson has acted in.

In 2013, Hutcherson voiced the character Nod in the animated action-adventure 3D film Epic, loosely based on William Joyce's book, The Leaf Men and the Brave Good Bugs; the film is his most commercially successful except for The Hunger Games series. As filming approached for The Hunger Games sequel, The Hunger Games: Catching Fire, he enlisted celebrity trainer Bobby Strom to assist him in five hour-long workouts per week. The film brought in $420 million at the North American box office, making it his most commercially successful film. Todd Gilchrist of Indiewire proclaimed of the actor's performance that "Hutcherson's maturing talents achieve a parallelism with the character's self-actualization, proving subtler and more self-aware with every resigned decision he makes on behalf of the people around him that he loves." Hutcherson received his second MTV Movie Award for "Best Male Performance" for his role in the sequel.

On November 23, 2013, the day following The Hunger Games: Catching Fires United States release, Hutcherson hosted an episode of Saturday Night Live. His performance received mediocre reviews, with Mike Ryan of The Huffington Post stating that he did not really bring "anything special to the table except having a nice attitude", and John Surico of GQ remarking that "while the night didn't necessarily disappoint, it also didn't dazzle".

Hutcherson again reprised his role in the two feature-length parts of the Mockingjay film adaptation. The Hunger Games: Mockingjay – Part 1 was released on November 21, 2014, and Part 2 followed on November 20, 2015. His character goes through a significant personality change in the films, which provided him with an acting challenge; he said, "I'm nervous about portraying it because I've never gone crazy before in a movie." Emily Yahr of The Washington Post spoke positively of his acting, by saying "Peeta's crazed expression is sure to haunt our nightmares for a long time," while David Edelstein of New York criticized his portrayal in relation to scenes with the other characters, saying "at least Josh Hutcherson's captured Peeta is mostly seen in interviews with Stanley Tucci's camp talk-show host on TV screens ... so the actor can't bring his lack of urgency to scenes with [Jennifer Lawrence]."

Before filming the Mockingjay movies, Hutcherson filmed Escobar: Paradise Lost, a French-Spanish thriller, which was released on January 16, 2015, in the U.S. He also served as an executive producer for the film, alongside first-time director Andrea Di Stefano, assisting with casting and blocking shots. Hutcherson said the opportunity "made [him] so hungry to do more like that". In November 2017, Hutcherson began starring in the science fiction comedy series Future Man on the video on demand service Hulu. In December 2022, Hutcherson was cast as Mike Schmidt in the film adaptation of Five Nights at Freddy's, based on the video game series of the same name.

Personal life
Hutcherson has cited actor Jake Gyllenhaal as an inspiration, admiring the way Gyllenhaal "has taken his career and the kind of jobs that he's taken". He has named actor, director, and producer Philip Seymour Hoffman as another of his inspirations.

Hutcherson currently lives in Los Angeles, California. In May 2012, he purchased the  $2.5 million former house of Heath Ledger in Laurel Canyon, Hollywood Hills, a small ranch built in 1951. He professes that fame has not changed him as a person, stating, "I love my job more than anything in the world and I could never imagine doing anything else. So this whole thing is a very small price to pay compared to someone who has to go to an office to work."

A known ally to the LGBT (lesbian, gay, bisexual and transgender) community, Hutcherson advocates the gay–straight alliance campaign "Straight But Not Narrow". Since its formation, he has been its most active supporter. His involvement with the LGBT community stems from his family ties; two of his uncles who were gay died of AIDS-related illnesses. In April 2012, he became the youngest recipient of the Vanguard Award from GLAAD, given for promoting equal rights for LGBT people. He was also awarded with Young Humanitarian Award at the 2015 unite4:humanity award ceremony. Regarding his own sexuality, he considers himself to be "mostly straight" and does not believe in being limited by labels. Hutcherson also worked alongside The Trevor Project and human-I-T in 2014 when he began his campaign "Power On", which serves to help young LGBT people from rural areas to form communities by donating old computers and cell phones to LGBT resource centers; he began the campaign by donating an old computer of his own. Yearly in 2012–2014, he has hosted the "Josh Hutcherson Celebrity Basketball Game" in Los Angeles, which raises funds and awareness for the "Straight But Not Narrow" campaign. In November 2013, Hutcherson and Queen Latifah presented trophies together to four young community volunteers in a live ceremony at the fifth annual TeenNick HALO Awards at the Hollywood Palladium.

Hutcherson endorsed and actively campaigned for Senator Bernie Sanders for President in the 2016 and 2020 U.S. presidential elections.

Filmography

Film

Television

Music videos

Awards and nominations
During the first stage of Hutcherson's acting career, he received eight Young Artist Award nominations, four of which he won. He and the cast of 2010's The Kids Are All Right received eight nominations for "Best Cast" or "Best Ensemble" by eight different organizations including SAG-AFTRA and Broadcast Film Critics Association. For The Hunger Games, Hutcherson and his co-stars were nominated for ten awards, winning eight of them, including National Association of Theatre Owners' 2012 "Breakthrough Performer of the Year" and Logo TV's 2012 "Next Mega Star".

State orders and honors
Hutcherson holds the commission of a Colonel of the Commonwealth of Kentucky.

References

Bibliography

External links

 
 Josh Hutcherson at The New York Times
 Josh Hutcherson at Fandango
 Josh Hutcherson at Focus Features
 
 Josh Hutcherson at Biography.com
 Straight But Not Narrow  website

1992 births
Living people
21st-century American male actors
Activists from California
Activists from Kentucky
American film producers
American male child actors
American male film actors
American male television actors
American male voice actors
American philanthropists
American LGBT rights activists
Male actors from California
Male actors from Kentucky
Male actors from Los Angeles
People from Boone County, Kentucky